Aderemi Oluyomi Kuku (March 20, 1941 – February 13, 2022), popularly known as Kuku, was a Nigerian professor of mathematics and a former president of the African Mathematical Union (AMU) and the African Academy of Sciences Kenya.

Life 

Aderemi Kuku was born  in   Ijebu-Ode, Ogun State, on March 20, 1941, as the third child of  the family of Busari Adeoye Kuku and Abusatu Oriaran Baruwa who were Photographer and trader respectively.

Education 
Aderemi Kuku attended both Bishop Oluwole Memorial School, Agege, Lagos State and St James School Anglican primary school, Oke-Odan, Ogun State in order to obtain his primary school leaving certificate. In 1959, he obtained his West African Senior School Certificate from Eko Boys High School, Lagos, Nigeria.  He received his B.Sc. in mathematics from University of London, MSc and PhD from University of  Ibadan from 1965 to 1971.

Career 
In 1966, Kuku was an assistant Lecturer at the University of Ife  Ile Ife in Osun State, Nigeria. In 1968, he became lecturer II at University of Ibadan. In 1976, he became a senior lecturer at University of Ibadan. In 1980, he became a reader and in 1982, he became a full professor of mathematics at the University of Ibadan.

Awards and honors 
Kuku has received the following:
 He was a fellow and the president  of the African Academy of Sciences
 He was  member of the European Academy of Arts Science and Humanities
He was a Member and the immediate past President of  African Mathematical Union
He was a Founder fellow of  Mathematical Association of Nigeria
 He received the Ogun State Special Merit Award in 1987
 He was a fellow of the Nigerian Academy of Science
 He was a fellow of The World Academy of Sciences
 He received a Distinguished Achievement Award from the USA National Association of Mathematicians in 1993
 He was awarded the African Mathematical Union Medal in 2000
 He was a foreign Fellow of Mongolian Academy of Sciences
 He received the presidential award of Officer of the Order of the Niger (OON) in  2008
 He was a fellow of the African Science Institute
 He was awarded the Nigerian National Order of Merit  in 2009
 He was honoured with an International Conference on Algebraic K-theory on his  70th birthday  at Nanjing University China in 2011
 He was a Founder Fellow of the American Mathematical Society
 He was awarded a Life-time Achievement Award by the University of Ibadan in 2018

References 

1941 births
2022 deaths
People from Ogun State
20th-century Nigerian mathematicians
Academic staff of the University of Ibadan
21st-century Nigerian mathematicians
Fellows of the African Academy of Sciences